Meta AI is an artificial intelligence laboratory that belongs to Meta Platforms Inc. (formerly known as Facebook, Inc.) Meta AI intends to develop various forms of artificial intelligence, improving augmented and artificial reality technologies. Meta AI is an academic research laboratory focused on generating knowledge for the AI community. This is in contrast to Facebook's Applied Machine Learning (AML) team, which focuses on practical applications of its products.

History 
Meta AI started as Facebook Artificial Intelligence Research (FAIR) with locations in the Menlo Park, California, headquarters, London, United Kingdom, and a new laboratory in Manhattan. FAIR was officially announced in September, 2013. FAIR was directed by New York University's Yann LeCun, a deep learning Professor and Turing Award winner. Working with NYU's Center for Data Science, FAIR's initial goal was to research data science, machine learning, and artificial intelligence. FAIR's goal was "to understand intelligence, to discover its fundamental principles, and to make machines significantly more intelligent". Research at FAIR pioneered the technology that led to face recognition, tagging in photographs, and personalized feed recommendation. Vladimir Vapnik, a pioneer in statistical learning, joined FAIR in 2014, he is the co-inventor of the support-vector machine, and one of the developers of the Vapnik–Chervonenkis theory.

FAIR opened a research center in Paris, France in 2015, and subsequently launched smaller satellite research labs in Seattle, Pittsburgh, Tel Aviv, Montreal and London. In 2016, FAIR partnered with Google, Amazon, IBM, and Microsoft in creating the Partnership on Artificial Intelligence to Benefit People and Society, an organization with a focus on open licensed research, supporting ethical and efficient research practices, and discussing fairness, inclusivity, and transparency.

In 2018, Jérôme Pesenti, former CTO of IBM's big data group, assumed the role of president of FAIR, while LeCun stepped down to serve as chief AI scientist. In 2018, FAIR was placed 25th in the AI Research Rankings 2019, which ranked the top global organizations leading AI research. FAIR quickly rose to eighth position in 2019, and maintained eighth position in the 2020 rank. FAIR had approximately 200 staff in 2018, and had the goal to double that number by 2020.

FAIR's initial work included research in learning-model enabled memory networks, self-supervised learning and generative adversarial networks, text classification and translation, as well as computer vision. FAIR released Torch deep-learning modules and in 2017, FAIR released PyTorch, an open-source machine learning framework. PyTorch was subsequently used in several deep learning technologies, such as Tesla's autopilot  and Uber's Pyro. Also in 2017, FAIR discontinued a research project once AI bots developed a language that was unintelligible to humans, inciting conversations about dystopian fear of artificial intelligence going out of control. However, FAIR clarified that the research had been shut down because they had accomplished their initial goal to understand how languages are generated, rather than out of fear.

FAIR was renamed Meta AI following the rebranding that changed Facebook, Inc to Meta Platforms Inc.

In 2022, Meta AI predicted the 3D shape of 600 millions of potential proteins in two weeks.

Current research 
In the February 23, 2022, live event Inside the Lab: Building for the Metaverse with AI, the Meta AI team discussed the major advancements in research and development in artificial intelligence. One such tool is the BuilderBot, which allows users to generate virtual worlds by using voice commands. Other tools include the No Language Left Behind, a system capable of automatic translation between written languages, and a Universal Speech Translator, a system capable of instantaneous speech-to-speech translation.

Computer vision 
Meta AI's computer vision research aims to extract information about the environment from digital images and videos. One example of computer vision technology developed by AI is panoptic segmentation, which recognizes objects in the foreground but also classifies the scenes in the background. Meta AI seeks to improve Visual Question Answering technology, in which a machine answers human user questions about images using cycle-consistency, having the machine generate a question in addition to the answer to address linguistic variations in the questions.

Natural language processing and conversational AI 
Artificial intelligence communication requires a machine to understand natural language and to generate language that is natural. Meta AI seeks to improve these technologies to improve safe communication regardless of what language the user might speak. Thus, a central task involves the generalization of natural language processing (NLP) technology to other languages. As such, Meta AI actively works on unsupervised machine translation. Meta AI seeks to improve natural-language interfaces by developing aspects of chitchat dialogue such as repetition, specificity, response-relatedness and question-asking, incorporating personality into image captioning, and generating creativity-based language.

In 2018, Meta AI launched the open-source PyText, a modeling framework focused on NLP systems.

In 2023, Meta AI announced and open sourced LLaMA (Large Language Model Meta AI), a 65B parameter large language model.

Ranking and recommendations 
Facebook and Instagram uses Meta AI research in ranking & recommendations in their newsfeeds, ads, and search results. Meta AI has also introduced ReAgent, a toolset that generates decisions and evaluates user feedback.

Systems research 
Machine learning and AI depend on the development of novel algorithms, software and hardware technologies. As such, Meta AI's systems research teams studies computer languages, compilers, and hardware applications.

Theory 
Meta AI studies the mathematical and theoretical foundations of artificial intelligence. Meta AI has publications in learning theory, optimization, and signal processing.

References 

Meta Platforms
Artificial intelligence laboratories
2013 establishments in California